This is a list of castles in Slovenia.

A

 Ajman Castle

B

 Baumkircher Tower
 Bela Peč Castle
 Betnava Castle
Bistrica Castle
Bled Castle
 Bogenšperk Castle
 Bokalce Castle
 Borl Castle
 Branik Castle
 Brdo Castle near Kranj
 Brežice Castle
 Bucelleni-Ruard Manor

C

 Celje Castle

G
 Gracar Turn
 Gradac, Slovenia
 Gonobitz castle

I
 Ig Castle

J
 Jablje Castle
 Jakobski Dol Castle

K

 Kacenštajn Castle
 Kalec Castle
 Kieselstein Castle
 Koprivnik Castle
 Kos Manor
 Kostel Castle
 Kozjak Castle
 Kravjek Castle
 Krško Castle
 Krumperk Castle
 Kunšperk

L
 Leutemberg Castle
 Lihtenberk Castle
 Lipnica Castle
 Lož Castle
 Ljubljana Castle

M

 Maribor Castle
 Medija Castle
 Metlika Castle
 Miren Castle
 Mokrice Castle

O
 Olimje Castle
 Ortnek Castle

P
 Podsmreka Castle
 Polhov Gradec Castle
 Predjama Castle
 Ptuj Castle

R

 Račji Dvor Manor
 Raka Castle
 Ravne Castle
 Rihemberk Castle
 Rajhenburg Castle

S
 Strmol Mansion
 Strmol Castle

Š 

 Škrljevo Castle

V

 Velenje Castle
 Vipava Castle

W
 Water Tower, Maribor

Z
 Zonec Castle

Ž
 Žovnek Castle

See also
List of castles

 
Slovenia
Castles
Slovenia
Castles